Perry Township is one of the seventeen townships of Logan County, Ohio, United States. As of the 2010 census, the population was 992.

Geography
Located in the eastern part of the county, it borders the following townships:
Bokes Creek Township - north
York Township, Union County - northeast
Liberty Township, Union County - east
Zane Township - south
Monroe Township - southwest corner
Jefferson Township - west
Rushcreek Township - northwest

Part of the village of West Mansfield is located in northeastern Perry Township, and the unincorporated community of East Liberty lies in the township's south.

Name and history
Perry Township was organized in 1830, and named for Commodore Oliver Hazard Perry. It is one of 25 Perry Townships statewide.

Government
The township is governed by a three-member board of trustees, who are elected in November of odd-numbered years to a four-year term beginning on the following January 1. Two are elected in the year after the presidential election and one is elected in the year before it. There is also an elected township fiscal officer, who serves a four-year term beginning on April 1 of the year after the election, which is held in November of the year before the presidential election. Vacancies in the fiscal officership or on the board of trustees are filled by the remaining trustees.

In the elections of November 2007, Gary Baker defeated Brian Tacey in the election for the position of township trustee, while Cindy Stalling was elected without opposition to the position of township fiscal officer.

Transportation
Important highways in Perry Township include U.S. Route 33 and State Routes 292, 347, and 540.

References

External links

County website
County and township map of Ohio
Detailed Logan County map

Townships in Logan County, Ohio
Townships in Ohio
1830 establishments in Ohio
Populated places established in 1830